Talitrus is a genus of amphipod crustaceans, including the familiar European sandhopper Talitrus saltator. In includes the following species:
Talitrus curioi Javier & Coleman, 2010
Talitrus gulliveri Miers, 1875
Talitrus saltator (Montagu, 1808)
Talitrus trukana K. H. Barnard, 1960

References

Gammaridea
Taxa named by Louis Augustin Guillaume Bosc
Taxa named by Pierre André Latreille